SQM or sqm may refer to:
 Sociedad Química y Minera de Chile, a Chilean mining and chemical enterprise
 Software quality management
 Sky quality meter, to measure night sky brightness
 Supersymmetric quantum mechanics
 São Miguel do Araguaia airport, IATA code
 Smart Queue Management, a technique to avoid congestion in computer networks
 Windows Live Messenger log file extension, see list of filename extensions (S–Z)#S